Williamsburg High School is a public high school in Williamsburg, Ohio.  It is the only high school in the Williamsburg Local School District. It serves around 600 students in the Middle and High Schools. There was a new building built in 1996 and still runs today

Athletics 

 2017 Softball State Champions
 Carly Wagers - Gatorade State Softball Player of the Year 2016-2017

Notes and references

External links
 
 District website

High schools in Clermont County, Ohio
Public high schools in Ohio